Rita Clark (September 12, 1915 – May 9, 2008) is a former Republican member of the Pennsylvania House of Representatives.

References

Republican Party members of the Pennsylvania House of Representatives
Women state legislators in Pennsylvania
2008 deaths
1915 births
20th-century American politicians
20th-century American women politicians
21st-century American women